Tom Ryan (1941 – 20 March 2023) was an Irish sportsperson.  He played hurling with his local club Killenaule and with the Tipperary senior inter-county team in the 1960s.

References

External links 
 "Local History from Killenaule", with a section on Tom Ryan
 Tipperary GAA archives 

1941 births
2023 deaths
Killenaule hurlers
Tipperary inter-county hurlers
All-Ireland Senior Hurling Championship winners